Jens Gerhardt Sørensen (23 March 1921 – 18 July 2002) was a Danish rower. He competed at the 1948 Summer Olympics in London with the men's eight where they were eliminated in the round one repêchage.

References

1921 births
2002 deaths
Danish male rowers
Olympic rowers of Denmark
Rowers at the 1948 Summer Olympics
People from Odsherred Municipality
European Rowing Championships medalists
Sportspeople from Region Zealand